Ladislas Fodor (1898–1978) was a Hungarian novelist, playwright and screenwriter.

Plays
A Church Mouse (A templom egére); a comedy in three acts, adapted by James L. A. Burrell (1928)
Jewel Robbery (Ékszerrablás a Váci utcában); a comedy in three acts, adapted by Bertram Bloch (1931)
I Love an Actress (Szeretek egy színésznőt); a comedy in four acts, adapted by Chester Erskin (1932)
The Kiss Before the Mirror (Csók a tükör előtt); a drama in three acts (1932)
Youth at the Helm (Helyet az ifjúságnak) (1933)

Matura (Érettségi); a comedy in three acts (1934)
A Woman Lies (Egy asszony hazudik); a drama in three acts (1935)

The Night Before the Divorce (Die Nacht vor der Scheidung); comedy (1937)
Strange Case of Blondie White (Katzenzungen, 1934); a play in three acts, adapted by Bernard Merivale and Jeffrey Dell (1938)
Birthday Gift (Születésnapi ajándék); a play in three acts (1939)

The Vigil (1947)
Europa and the Bull (1952)

Filmography

Films Based on Plays by Ladislas Fodor
Poor as a Church Mouse, directed by Richard Oswald (Germany, 1931, based on the play A Church Mouse) 
Beauty and the Boss, directed by Roy Del Ruth (1932, based on the play A Church Mouse) 
Jewel Robbery, directed by William Dieterle (1932, based on the play Jewel Robbery) 
The Kiss Before the Mirror, directed by James Whale (1933, based on the play The Kiss Before the Mirror) 
La Cinquième empreinte, directed by Karl Anton (France, 1934, based on the play Lilas blanc) 
The Church Mouse, directed by Monty Banks (UK, 1934, based on the play A Church Mouse) 
Lärm um Weidemann, directed by Johann Alexander Hübler-Kahla (Germany, 1935, based on the play Youth at the Helm) (uncredited)
The White Lilac, directed by Albert Parker (UK, 1935, based on the play Lilas blanc) 
Thunder in the Night, directed by George Archainbaud (1935, based on the play A Woman Lies) 
The Unguarded Hour, directed by Sam Wood (1936, based on the play The Unguarded Hour) 
Girls' Dormitory, directed by Irving Cummings (1936, based on the play Matura) 
Jack of All Trades, directed by Robert Stevenson and Jack Hulbert (UK, 1936, based on the play Youth at the Helm) 
Wives Under Suspicion, directed by James Whale (1938, based on the play The Kiss Before the Mirror) 
, directed by Camillo Mastrocinque (Italy, 1940, based on the play Youth at the Helm)
Footsteps in the Dark, directed by Lloyd Bacon (1941, based on the play Strange Case of Blondie White) 
, directed by Schamyl Bauman (Sweden, 1941, based on the play A Church Mouse) 
A Very Young Lady, directed by Harold D. Schuster (1941, based on the play Matura) 
Frøken Kirkemus, directed by Lau Lauritzen Jr. and Alice O'Fredericks (Denmark, 1941, based on the play A Church Mouse) 
The Night Before the Divorce, directed by Robert Siodmak (1942, based on the play The Night Before the Divorce) 
The Peterville Diamond, directed by Walter Forde (UK, 1943, based on the play Jewel Robbery) 
Drei, von denen man spricht, directed by Axel von Ambesser (West Germany, 1953, based on the play Youth at the Helm)
A House Full of Love, directed by Hans Schweikart (West Germany, 1954, based on the play Fräulein Fortuna) 
Love Without Illusions, directed by Erich Engel (West Germany, 1955, based on the play Ärztliches Geheimnis) 
North to Alaska, directed by Henry Hathaway (1960, based on the play Birthday Gift) 
, directed by Alekos Sakellarios (Greece, 1965, based on the play A Church Mouse)
Más pobre que una laucha, directed by Julio Saraceni  (Argentina, 1955, based on the play A Church Mouse)

Ladislas Fodor as Screenwriter

Le Bal (France/Germany, 1931) 
Charlie Chan in City in Darkness (1939) 
Seven Sinners (1940) 
Tales of Manhattan (1942) 
Cairo (1942) 
Isle of Missing Men (1942) 
Girl Trouble (1942) 
Tampico (1944) 
The Imperfect Lady (1947) 
The Other Love (1947) 
The Great Sinner (1949) 
The Man from Cairo (1953) 
Tom Thumb (1958) 
Menschen im Hotel (West Germany, 1959) 
Abschied von den Wolken (West Germany, 1959) 
 Grounds for Divorce (West Germany, 1960)
Das Riesenrad (West Germany, 1961) 
The Return of Doctor Mabuse (West Germany, 1961) 
Breakfast in Bed (West Germany, 1963) 
 Scotland Yard Hunts Dr. Mabuse (West Germany, 1963) 
 The Strangler of Blackmoor Castle (West Germany, 1963)
Old Shatterhand (West Germany, 1964) 
The Secret of Dr. Mabuse (West Germany, 1964) 
 The Treasure of the Aztecs (West Germany, 1965) 
The Pyramid of the Sun God (West Germany, 1965) 
Die Nibelungen (West Germany, 1966) 
The Peking Medallion (Italy/France/West Germany, 1967) 
Im Banne des Unheimlichen (West Germany, 1968) 
Kampf um Rom (West Germany, 1968) 
 The Man with the Glass Eye (West Germany, 1969)
Strogoff (Italy/France/West Germany, 1970) 
The Devil Came from Akasava (Spain/West Germany, 1971) 
Es muss nicht immer Kaviar sein (West Germany, 1977, TV series)

External links
Ladislas Fodor at IMDb

1898 births
1978 deaths
Male screenwriters
20th-century Hungarian dramatists and playwrights
Hungarian male novelists
Hungarian male dramatists and playwrights
20th-century Hungarian male writers
20th-century Hungarian novelists
20th-century Hungarian screenwriters